Phractura longicauda is a species of catfish in the genus Phractura. It is found in the coastal rivers of south Cameroon, Equatorial Guinea, and the Congo River basin. It has a length of three inches.

References 

longicauda
Freshwater fish of Africa
Fish described in 1902
Taxa named by George Albert Boulenger